Jackfield Tile Museum is a museum which presents the history of the British decorative tile industry between 1840 and 1960, the period in which this factory and that of Maw & Co nearby played an important part in this industry.  The museum lies in the village of Jackfield, near Broseley, on the south bank of the River Severn in the Ironbridge Gorge, in Shropshire, England. It is located within a World Heritage Site, the birthplace of the Industrial Revolution. It is one of the ten Ironbridge Gorge museums administered by the Ironbridge Gorge Museum Trust.

The museum is housed in a decorative tile factory building, the former works of Craven Dunnill and Company, that is still used to produce tiles, particularly encaustic tiles.

Jackfield is one of the oldest known ceramic production centres in Shropshire, a tradition dating back to the 16th century. The Thursfield family settled in Jackfield during the early 18th century; Jackfield wares are attributed to the family.

Craven Dunnill gave up its Jackfield works in the early 1950s, moving to Bridgnorth, and the buildings were used by a firm making iron and bronze castings. In 1983, the Ironbridge Gorge Museum Trust purchased the works with the aid of an Architectural Heritage Fund grant. In 1989, tile manufacture restarted on the site and in 2001 Craven Dunnill took over this business again.

The collections include William De Morgan and other historic tilers.

See also
Listed buildings in Broseley

References

External links 

Jackfield Tile Museum website
 Shropshire Tourism information
 Virtual Shropshire information

Museums in Shropshire
Industry museums in England
Decorative arts museums in England
History of Shropshire
Ironbridge Gorge
Ceramics museums in the United Kingdom
Ironbridge Gorge Museum Trust
Tiling
Grade II* listed buildings in Shropshire
Industrial archaeological sites in England